Francis John McConnell (August 18, 1871 – August 18, 1953) was an American social reformer and a bishop in the Methodist Episcopal Church, elected in 1912.

Born on August 18, 1871, in Trinway, Ohio, he died on August 18, 1953, in Lucasville, Ohio.

McConnell was a graduate of the Ohio Wesleyan University and the Boston University School of Theology.  He was an ordained minister in the Methodist Episcopal Church for many years, serving among other places a large church in Brooklyn, New York.

Before election to the episcopacy, McConnell served as the president of DePauw University, Greencastle, Indiana, 1909–1912.  During his presidency he led the university's first major fund drive, the Campaign for the Seventy-Fifth Anniversary Fund, which produced a total subscription of $550,546.

Francis John McConnell was a major second-generation advocate of Boston personalism who sought to apply the philosophy to social problems of his time.

McConnell is best known for his quote "We need a type of patriotism that recognizes the virtues of those who are opposed to us".

Publications
 Mcconnell, Bishop Francis; Report On The Steel Strike Of 1919 Online 
 McConnell, Bishop Francis John, "The Christlike God", A survey of the Divine Attributes from the Christian Point of View, copyright 1927 by the author, first edition printed March 1927, The Abingdon Press, New York and Cincinnati.

See also
List of bishops of the United Methodist Church

References

External links
Presidents of DePauw University
Francis John McConnell quotes
Francis John McConnell papers at DePauw University
 
 

Bishops of the Methodist Episcopal Church
American Methodist bishops
1871 births
1953 deaths
Boston University School of Theology alumni
Presidents of DePauw University
American autobiographers
American biographers
People from Muskingum County, Ohio
Ohio Wesleyan University alumni
American social reformers
World Christianity scholars